The genus Phaeoclavulina comprises approximately 55 species of coral fungi.

Description
Basidiocarps may range in color from bright yellow, to ochre, orange or shades of tan. The spores of Phaeoclavulina species are ochre-brown in mass deposit and are echinulate.

Species
The following species are recognised in the genus Phaeoclavulina:
 
Phaeoclavulina abietina
Phaeoclavulina africana
Phaeoclavulina alboapiculata
Phaeoclavulina angustata
Phaeoclavulina apiahyna
Phaeoclavulina arcosuensis
Phaeoclavulina argentea
Phaeoclavulina articulotela
Phaeoclavulina camellia
Phaeoclavulina campestris
Phaeoclavulina campoi
Phaeoclavulina capucina
Phaeoclavulina carovinacea
Phaeoclavulina caroviridula
Phaeoclavulina cervicornis
Phaeoclavulina clavarioides
Phaeoclavulina cokeri
Phaeoclavulina coniferarum
Phaeoclavulina corrugata
Phaeoclavulina curta
Phaeoclavulina cyanocephala
Phaeoclavulina decolor
Phaeoclavulina decurrens
Phaeoclavulina echinovirens
Phaeoclavulina eumorpha
Phaeoclavulina flaccida
Phaeoclavulina gigantea
Phaeoclavulina glauco-aromatica
Phaeoclavulina grandis
Phaeoclavulina griseobrunnea
Phaeoclavulina guadelupensis
Phaeoclavulina guyanensis
Phaeoclavulina insignis
Phaeoclavulina liliputiana
Phaeoclavulina longicaulis
Phaeoclavulina macrospora
Phaeoclavulina minutispora
Phaeoclavulina murrillii
Phaeoclavulina mutabilis
Phaeoclavulina myceliosa
Phaeoclavulina nigricans
Phaeoclavulina ochracea
Phaeoclavulina pancaribbea
Phaeoclavulina pseudozippelii
Phaeoclavulina quercus-ilicis
Phaeoclavulina retispora
Phaeoclavulina roellinii
Phaeoclavulina sikkimia
Phaeoclavulina subclaviformis
Phaeoclavulina subdecurrens
Phaeoclavulina tropicalis
Phaeoclavulina vinaceipes
Phaeoclavulina viridis
Phaeoclavulina zealandica
Phaeoclavulina zippelii

References

External links

Mushroom Observer "Clubs and Corals" by Michael Kuo
Phaeoclavulina and Ramaria (Gomphaceae, Gomphales) from Nam Nao National Park, Thailand
Species Fungorum - Phaeoclavulina

Gomphaceae
Agaricomycetes genera